Heterophallus is a genus of small poeciliids found near the coast in calm waters of river basins in southeastern Mexico.

Species
There are currently two or three recognized species in this genus:
 Heterophallus echeagarayi (Álvarez, 1952) (Maya gambusia)
 Heterophallus milleri Radda, 1987 (Grijalva gambusia)
 Heterophallus rachovii Regan, 1914 (Coatzacoalcos gambusia)

FishBase places Heterophallus echeagarayi in the genus Gambusia.

References

Poeciliidae
Freshwater fish genera
Taxa named by Charles Tate Regan
Ray-finned fish genera
Endemic fish of Mexico
Freshwater fish of Mexico